Kakhaber Kvetenadze (born 3 June 1970) is a retired Georgian professional football player.

External links

1970 births
Living people
Soviet footballers
Footballers from Georgia (country)
FC Torpedo Kutaisi players
Georgia (country) international footballers
Expatriate footballers from Georgia (country)
Expatriate footballers in Kazakhstan
Expatriate footballers in Azerbaijan
Expatriate sportspeople from Georgia (country) in Kazakhstan
Expatriate sportspeople from Georgia (country) in Azerbaijan
Association football midfielders